The city of São Paulo is the largest city in Brazil and the largest in the Americas and western hemisphere. In the Greater Sao Paulo there are approximately 40,000-50,000 buildings above , which puts it in first place in the world in terms of the number of such buildings. mostly concentrated in the downtown along the Paulista Avenue and in the neighborhood of Brooklin. Municipal laws limit the construction of large skyscrapers.

Tallest buildings (+100 m)

Tallest building under construction (+100 m)

Complete list of Sao Paulo buildings above 20 floors

Timeline of tallest buildings 
At , the Company Business Towers was planned to become the tallest building in Brazil upon its completion, but the plans were changed and the building was built to a height of only .

References

São Paulo-related lists
São Paulo